Probable G-protein coupled receptor 34 is a protein that in humans is encoded by the GPR34 gene.

Function 

G protein-coupled receptors (GPCRs), such as GPR34, are integral membrane proteins containing 7 putative transmembrane domains (TMs). These proteins mediate signals to the interior of the cell via activation of heterotrimeric G proteins that in turn activate various effector proteins, ultimately resulting in a physiologic response.[supplied by OMIM]

References

Further reading 

 
 
 
 
 
 
 

G protein-coupled receptors